Totani (written: 戸谷) is a Japanese surname. Notable people with this surname include:

, Japanese voice actor
, Japanese voice actor and narrator
, Japanese astronomer

See also
South Australia v Totani

Japanese-language surnames